Events in the year 1996 in Bulgaria.

Incumbents 

 President: Zhelyu Zhelev
 Prime Minister: Zhan Videnov

Events 

 May 25 – King Simeon returned to Bulgaria.

Deaths
October 2 - Andrey Lukanov, prime minister (1990)
December 17 - Stanko Todorov, prime minister (1971-1981)

References 

 
1990s in Bulgaria
Years of the 20th century in Bulgaria
Bulgaria
Bulgaria